George Ross (29 November 1869 - 1929) was a footballer who played in England in the 1890s and 1900s.

He played for Bury and won two FA Cup finals with them. In 1900 he was a member of the Bury team that defeated Southampton 4–0. In 1903 he was the Bury captain and made a significant contribution to their victory, scoring the first goal in their record 6–0 win over Derby County. He was also in the Bury team that won the 1899 Lancashire Senior Cup.

References

1869 births
1928 deaths
Association football wing halves
English Football League players
Bury F.C. players
English footballers
FA Cup Final players